German Carrasquilla (born 4 August 1966) is a Colombian sports shooter. He competed in the men's 10 metre air rifle event at the 1984 Summer Olympics.

References

1966 births
Living people
Colombian male sport shooters
Olympic shooters of Colombia
Shooters at the 1984 Summer Olympics
Place of birth missing (living people)